Latinobarómetro Corporation is a private non-profit organization, based in Providencia, Chile. It is responsible for carrying out Latinobarómetro, an annual public opinion survey that involves some 20,000 interviews in 18 Latin American countries, representing more than 600 million people. It observes the development of democracies, economies and societies, using indicators of attitude, opinion and behavior.

See also
Afrobarometer
Eurobarometer
World Values Survey

References

External links
 Website
 Latinobarómetro Survey 1996-2000

Public opinion research companies
Non-profit organisations based in Chile
Latin American studies
Statistical data sets
Companies of Chile